

Events

February events 
 February 16 – The São Paulo Railway in Brazil is opened, including an incline system on the Serra do Mar.

April events 
 April 18 – Bristol and Exeter Railway's Portishead branch, built by the Bristol and Portishead Pier and Railway Company, opens.

May events 
 May 7 – The Windsor and Annapolis Railway is incorporated in Nova Scotia.

June events
 June 29 – The Warrington rail crash in England kills 8 people.

August events 
 August 10 – The first railway in Indonesia (Dutch East Indies) (and the first in Asia outside the Indian subcontinent) opens between Semarang and Tanggun in central Java (.
 August 21 – The rack railway at Mount Morgan, Queensland, Australia, opens between Rockhampton and Westwood via Kabra.
 August 24 – Opening of railway over the Brenner Pass between Austria and Italy.
 August 27 – J. Nason and J. F. Wilson, both of Boston, Massachusetts, are awarded the first U.S. patent covering level crossing gates.

September events
 September 4 – The Boston and Albany Railroad is formed through the merger of four smaller railroads in New England.

October events
 October – John S. Eldridge succeeds Robert H. Berdell as president of the Erie Railroad.

November events
November 19 – The Denver Pacific Railway and Telegraph Company incorporated.

December events
 December 1 – Skjærdalen and Tyristrand are connected on the Randsfjorden Line in Norway.
 December 9 – The Lyttelton rail tunnel in New Zealand of 2595m between Christchurch and the port of Lyttelton is opened.
 December 18 – The 'Angola Horror' train wreck kills 49 people near Angola, New York when the last coach of a Lake Shore train derails and plunges down a gulley.

Unknown date events
 Cornelius Vanderbilt acquires control of the New York Central railroad.
 The Lehigh Valley Railroad places the first 2-10-0 steam locomotives in the world into use.
 Construction on the Union Pacific Railroad reaches Cheyenne, Wyoming.  
 An early form of dome car is introduced in Russia.
 Construction on the Kansas Pacific Railway reaches Salina, Kansas.

Births

Unknown date births
 Carl R. Gray, president of the Union Pacific Railroad 1920–1937 (d. 1939).

Deaths

January deaths
 January 5 – William Norris, American steam locomotive builder and founder of Norris Locomotive Works (b. 1802).

February deaths
 February 7 – William Dargan, Irish railway contractor (b. 1799).

June deaths
 June 13 - Gridley Bryant, inventor of many basic railroad technologies including track and wheels (b. 1789).

References
 American locomotive engineers.  Retrieved February 9, 2005.